Guruve is one of several districts in the Mashonaland Central province of Zimbabwe.  The district capital is the town of Guruve.
It has 2 districts which are Upper Guruve Rural District and the Lower Guruve Rural District which is locally known referred to as Mbire District. Mbire District can be traced back to the Munhumutapa Dynasty. Guruve is demarcated into 2 constituencies which are Guruve-North Constituency and Guruve-South Constituency.

References

Districts of Mashonaland Central Province